Francesco Francavilla is an Italian comic book artist known for his creator-owned series The Black Beetle and pulp-inspired comic covers. Other notable works include The Black Coat (which he co-created), Dynamite's Zorro series, and his recent run on Detective Comics with Scott Snyder and Jock.

Career

Francesco Francavilla made his professional comics debut in the Italian comics anthology Amazing Comics.

Within the industry he has become known for his pulp and retro-inspired style. He runs a blog, Pulp Sunday, dedicated to this kind of work. His cover work is particularly noteworthy, he won an Eisner for it in 2012.

He has worked as an interior artist for both Marvel Comics (Black Panther: The Man without Fear, Captain America and Bucky, Hawkeye) and DC Comics (Detective Comics for The Black Mirror story arc, which won the 2012 Eisner for best ongoing series). Most recently he has been focusing on The Black Beetle, a series he originally created for his Pulp Sunday blog, which is now being published by Dark Horse Comics. This series has already had wide critical acclaim and has been made an ongoing series as a part of Dark Horse Comics' superhero push.

Bibliography
Interior comic work includes:
The Black Coat (with Adam Cogan and Ben Lichius, Ape Entertainment):
 A Call to Arms #1-4 (2006)
 Or Give Me Death #1 (of 4) (2007)
Sea of Red #11-13 (layouts for Paul Harmon, written by Rick Remender, Image, 2006)
24Seven Volume 2: "Confession" (script and art, anthology graphic novel, Image, 2007)
Fear Agent #11: "Along Come a Spider" (with Rick Remender, Image, 2007)
Left on Mission #1-5 (with Chip Mosher, Boom! Studios, 2007)
Sorrow #1-4 (with Rick Remender and Seth Peck, Image, 2007–2008)
Zorro vol. 6 #1-8, 15-20 (with Matt Wagner, Dynamite, 2008–2010)
Tales of the Starlight Drive-in: "1966" and "1972" (with Michael San Giacomo, anthology graphic novel, Image, 2008)
The Fantastic Worlds of Frank Frazetta: Dracula Meets the Wolfman (with Steve Niles, one-shot, Image, 2009)
Scalped #27: "High Lonesome, Part Three: The Ballad of Baylis Earl Nitz" (with Jason Aaron, Vertigo, 2009)
Green Hornet: Year One #1-6 (colors on Aaron Campbell, written by Matt Wagner, Dynamite, 2010)
Garrison #1-6 (with Jeff Mariotte, Wildstorm, 2010)
Detective Comics (DC Comics):
 "Skeleton Cases" (with Scott Snyder, in vol. 1 #871-872, 874-875 and 879, 2011)
 "The Face in the Glass" (with Scott Snyder and Jock, in vol. 1 #881, 2011)
 "Rain" (script and art, in vol. 2 #27, 2011)
Black Panther (with David Liss, Marvel):
 The Man without Fear #513-515, 517-518 and 521-523 (2011)
 The Most Dangerous Man Alive #524 (2011)
Captain America (Marvel):
 "Old Wounds" (with Ed Brubaker and James Asmus, in #625-628, 2011–2012)
 "Captain America and Black Widow" (with Cullen Bunn, in #636-640, 2012–2013)
Outlaw Territory Volume 2: "Lullaby" (script and art, anthology graphic novel, Image, 2011)
The Black Beetle (script and art, Dark Horse):
 Dark Horse Presents (anthology):
 "The Night Shift" (in vol. 2 #11-13, 2012)
 "Kara Böcek" (in vol. 3 #28-32, 2016–2017)
 No Way Out #1-4 (2013)
 Necrologue #1-5 (announced for 2013; unreleased)
Swamp Thing vol. 5 #10: "Arcane's Lullaby" (with Scott Snyder, DC Comics, 2012)
Robert E. Howard's Savage Sword #5: "Dark Agnes" (with Paul Tobin, anthology, Dark Horse, 2012)
Hawkeye vol. 4 #10, 12 (with Matt Fraction, Marvel, 2013)
Batwoman #21: "Interlude III" (with Haden Blackman and J. H. Williams III, DC Comics, 2013)
Afterlife with Archie #1-10 (with Roberto Aguirre-Sacasa, Archie Comics, 2013–2016)
American Vampire Anthology #1: "The Producers" (script and art, Vertigo, 2013)
Guardians of the Galaxy vol. 3 #8-9: "Infinity" (with Brian Michael Bendis, Marvel, 2013–2014)
Vertigo Quarterly: CMYK #4 "The Dying of the Light" (script and art, anthology, Vertigo, 2015)
The Shadow #100: "The Laughing Corpse" (script and art, co-feature, Dynamite, 2015)
Moon Knight vol. 6 #5-9 (with Jeff Lemire, Greg Smallwood, Wilfredo Torres and James Stokoe, Marvel, 2016–2017)
All-Star Batman #6-9: "The Cursed Wheel, Act Two" (with Scott Snyder, co-feature, DC Comics, 2017)
Will Eisner's The Spirit: The Corpse Makers #1-5 (script and art, Dynamite, 2017–2018)
DC Holiday Special 2017: "Going Down Easy" (with Tom King, anthology, DC Comics, 2018)
Hungry Ghosts #4: "The Cow Head" (with Anthony Bourdain, anthology, Berger Books, 2018)
Shock (script and art, anthology graphic novel, Aftershock):
 "Invasion" (in Volume 1, 2018)
 "The Last Confession" (in Volume 2, 2019)

Covers only

Awards
2012: Won "Favourite Newcomer Artist" Eagle Award
2012: Won "Best Cover Artist" Eisner Award
2016: Nominated "All-in-One Award" Inkwell Awards

Notes

References

External links

Pulp Sunday
The Art of Francesco Francavilla
Comic-Twart: Francesco Francavilla
An Audio Interview with Francesco Francavilla, Word Balloon, May 25, 2011

Eisner Award winners for Best Cover Artist
Italian comics artists
Living people
Place of birth missing (living people)
Year of birth missing (living people)